The Evertsz cabinet was the 8th cabinet of the Netherlands Antilles.

Composition
The cabinet was composed as follows:

|rowspan="3"|Minister of General Affairs
|Juancho Evertsz
|PNP
|20 December 1973
|-
|Lucinda da Costa Gomez-Matheeuws
|PNP
|1977
|-
|Leo A.I. Chance
|PPA
|1977
|-
|Minister of Justice
|Edgar J. “Watty” Vos
|MEP
|20 December 1973
|-
|Minister of Finance
|Efraim M. de Kort
|MEP
|20 December 1973
|-
|Minister of Constitutional Affairs and Education
|Hendrik S. Croes
|MEP
|20 December 1973
|-
|Minister of Social Affairs and Labor
|Rufus F. McWilliams
|PNP
|20 December 1973
|-
|Minister of Economic Affairs, Sports, Culture
|Ciro Domenico Kroon
|PNP
|20 December 1973
|-
|Minister of Welfare
|Miguel Pourier
|UPB
|20 December 1973
|-
|Minister of Public Health and Social Welfare
|Lucinda da Costa Gomez-Matheeuws
|PNP
|20 December 1973
|-
|Minister of Traffic and Communications
|Ernest Voges
|
|20 December 1973
|}

References

Cabinets of the Netherlands Antilles
1973 establishments in the Netherlands Antilles
Cabinets established in 1973
Cabinets disestablished in 1977
1977 disestablishments in the Netherlands Antilles